Tomás Martín Etcheverry (born 18 July 1999) is an Argentine tennis player. He has a career high ATP singles ranking of World No. 61, achieved on 6 March 2023. He also has a career high ATP doubles ranking of World No. 205, achieved on 19 September 2022.

Etcheverry has captured three ATP Challenger and five ITF titles in singles as well as six ITF and one ATP Challenger title in doubles.

Professional career

2021: ATP debut, maiden Challenger title, top 150 debut
Etcheverry made his ATP main draw debut at the 2021 Delray Beach Open, and won his first ATP match at the 2021 Córdoba Open defeating Andrej Martin.

Etcheverry captured his maiden Challenger title in Perugia, Italy defeating top seed Salvatore Caruso in the semifinal, for his maiden top 100 win, and Vitaliy Sachko in the final, rising to a new career-high ranking of World No. 166 on 19 July 2021.
He made his top 150 debut in singles at World No. 148 on 2 August 2021 after winning the Challenger title in Trieste, Italy. A week later he made his third Challenger final in Cordenons, Italy for 2021, where he lost to compatriot Francisco Cerundolo.

2022: Grand Slam and top 100 debut
Etcheverry made his Grand Slam main draw debut at the 2022 Australian Open after defeating Kimmer Coppejans, Jason Kubler, and Flavio Cobolli in the qualifications. He lost to nineteenth seed Pablo Carreno Busta in the first round.

He reached the top 100 at world No. 95 on 11 April 2022. As a result he made his Grand Slam debut at Rolland Garros, Wimbledon and at the US Open.

2023: First Grand Slam win & ATP final, Masters 1000 and top 65 debuts
He recorded his first Major win at the 2023 Australian Open defeating Grégoire Barrère.

At the 2023 Argentina Open he reached his first ATP quarterfinal defeating Hugo Dellien and Roberto Carballés Baena. In Rio he lost to seventh seed Albert Ramos Vinolas.
At the 2023 Chile Open he defeated Fabio Fognini in the first round. Next he defeated second seed Francisco Cerundolo to reach his second quarterfinal for the biggest win of his career. He reached his first ATP semifinal defeating Dusan Lajovic and then defeated third seed Sebastian Baez to reach his first ever final. As a result he moved to a new career high in the top 65 in the rankings. He lost in the final in three sets to home favorite Nicolas Jarry.

He made his Masters 1000 debut in Indian Wells as a direct entry.

Performance Timeline

Current through the 2023 Australian Open

ATP Career finals

Singles: 1 (1 runner-up)

ATP Challenger and ITF Futures finals

Singles: 21 (8–13)

Doubles: 14 (7–7)

References

External links
 
 

1999 births
Living people
Argentine male tennis players
Sportspeople from La Plata